"Whammy Kiss" is the second single released by The B-52's from their 1983 album Whammy!.

The song reached number nine on the U.S. Hot Dance Club Play chart, along with the album tracks "Legal Tender" and "Song for a Future Generation."

Track listing
 "Whammy Kiss" – 5:20
 "Song for a Future Generation" – 7:54

Chart positions

1983 singles
The B-52's songs
Songs written by Fred Schneider
Songs written by Kate Pierson
Songs written by Keith Strickland
Songs written by Cindy Wilson
Warner Records singles
1983 songs